Stephen Strong Gregory (1849–1920) was a prominent Chicago lawyer.

Biography

Stephen S. Gregory was born in Unadilla, New York on November 16, 1849. He is the brother of Charles Noble Gregory, himself a distinguished writer on legal subjects. His family moved to Madison, Wisconsin in 1858. He was educated at the University of Wisconsin–Madison, receiving an A.B. in 1870, an LL.B. in 1871, and an A.M.  in 1873.

Gregory began the practice of law in Madison, before moving to Chicago in 1874. In Chicago, he associated himself with Judge A. H. Chetlain in the law firm of Chetlain & Gregory.

In 1880, he married Janet M. Tappan, daughter of Arthur Tappan. The couple had three children together: Charlotte C. Gregory, Tappan Gregory, and Stephen S. Gregory, Jr.

He joined the firm of Tenney & Flower in 1879, with the firm shortly thereafter becoming Flower, Tenney & Gregory. He formed a new firm, Gregory, Booth & Flower in 1888. He founded a new firm in 1900, with his son Tappan becoming a partner.

Gregory's practice involved him in several high-profile cases. He represented Chicago in Illinois Central Railroad v. Illinois, 146 U.S. 387 (1892). He represented Patrick Eugene Prendergast after his 1893 assassination of Mayor of Chicago Carter Harrison, Sr.

Gregory served as president of the Chicago Bar Association in 1900, of the Illinois State Bar Association in 1904, and of the American Bar Association in 1911.

Gregory died on October 24, 1920.

References

American Bar Association Journal, Vol. 6 (1920)

1849 births
1920 deaths
Illinois lawyers
Wisconsin lawyers
People from Unadilla, New York
University of Wisconsin–Madison alumni
University of Wisconsin Law School alumni
19th-century American lawyers